The William Welch House is a historic house on Main Street in Canehill, Arkansas.  It is a -story wood-frame structure, with a side-gable roof, chimneys at the sides, and additions to the rear giving it a rough T shape.  A gable-roofed portico shelters the entrance, which is centered in the main three-bay facade.  The portico's gable, along with the house's gable ends and roofline, have been decorated with scalloped woodwork, probably added in the 1870s.  The house itself was probably built in the 1850s, and is one of Canehill's few antebellum houses, offering a distinctive combination of vernacular Greek Revival and later Victorian stylistic touches.

The house was listed on the National Register of Historic Places in 1982.

See also
National Register of Historic Places listings in Washington County, Arkansas

References

Houses on the National Register of Historic Places in Arkansas
Greek Revival houses in Arkansas
Houses completed in 1850
Houses in Washington County, Arkansas
National Register of Historic Places in Washington County, Arkansas
1850 establishments in Arkansas